The Solomon Islands passport is a document issued by  Solomon Islands, a Melanesian state in the south-west Pacific Ocean, to its citizens for the purposes of international travel.

As of 1 January 2017, Solomon Islands citizens had visa-free or visa on arrival access to 116 countries and territories, ranking the Solomon Islands passport 42nd in terms of travel freedom according to the Henley visa restrictions index.

See also
Visa requirements for Solomon Islands citizens

Notes

Solomon Islands
Government of the Solomon Islands